This article incorporates "medical abuse", which has a similar meaning but relates more specifically to harmful medical treatment rather than care in general, and may include victims who did not choose to be patients.

Patient abuse or neglect is any action or failure to act which causes unreasonable suffering, misery or harm to the patient. Elder abuse is classified as patient abuse of those older than 60 and forms a large proportion of patient abuse.

Abuse includes physically striking or sexually assaulting a patient. It also includes the intentional withholding of necessary food, physical care, and medical attention.
Neglect includes the failure to properly attend to the needs and care of a patient, or the unintentional causing of injury to a patient, whether by act or omission.
Patient abuse and neglect may occur in settings such as hospitals, nursing homes, clinics and during home-based care. Health professionals who abuse patients may be deemed unfit to practice and have their medical license removed as well as facing criminal charges as well as civil cases.

Abuse amongst the general adult population has not been well-addressed in literature.

Forms and individuals affected

Intellectual disabilities 
Public scandals involving individuals with intellectual disabilities have regularly occured in England during the last 50 years, most involving those in residential care.

Elder abuse 

Elder abuse refers to acts or omissions that cause harms to older people. Based on self-report by staff the prevalence of elder abuse in institutional settings  such as nursing homes is 64.2%. The prevelance of psychological abuse is 33.4%, physical abuse 14.1%, neglect 11.6%, and sexual abuse 1.9%. Risk factors for abuse were being female, cognitive impairment, and being older that 74.

Sexual abuse 
The rate of sexual abuse in the United States is 9.5 per 10,000 physicians per 10 years.Female and younger patients are more likely to experience sexual abuse and male doctors older who perform examinations in non-academic settings are more likely to perpetrate sexual abuse.

Boundary violations 
Therapeutic boundaries refers to limits in the relationships between healthcare workers and patients.

Gabard produced a typology of healthcare practictioners who engage in sexual boundary violations, which includes the predatory practictioner, characterise by antisocial personality disorder, masochist-surrenderer practictioner, who disregard norms in order to recue a patient, the loversick practictioner and the narcissitic practictioner.

Causes

Institutional abuse 
Studies propose that a culture of abuse in institutions dealing the those with intellectual disabilities is contributed to social isolation of residents, ineffective staff supervision, and a lack of recognition of abuse by staff.

Andrew Phelvin draws comparison between the institutional abuse at the Winterbourne View in the UK and the Iraq Abu Ghraib torture case and Stanford prison experiment citing Philip Zimbardo. He notes the playful nature of abuse amongst staff, the previous good character of the staff, "deviant norms" of the institution and deindividuation of staff. Discussing possible means of prevention, McDonnell et al, identify physical restraint as a potential mediator for the development of an abusive culture and suggest requiring management of organizations to demonstrate how its use is being reduced as well suggesting involving patients in their care and staff debriefing as means of reducing use. They also suggest an approach that pays attention to human rights, and positive risk taking,  leadership focused on providing feedback and monitoring good practice rather than administration, reflective practice, and encouraging a "low arousal" environment where staff modify their body language and perception of situations to reduce arousal in an environment.

History 
Barbara Robb, a psychotherapist, founded the group Aid for the Elderly in Government Institutions and launched a public campaign to highlight abuse and neglect of older patients in mental health institutions. She published the report Sans Everything: A Case to Answer based on material she received from the public in 1967.

Steve George argues that in the United Kingdom the killing of Killing of Jonathan Zito in 1992, created a narrative of risk posed by mental health patients that reduced concern for abuse of mental health patients.

Between 1983 and 1993 a large number of adults with learning difficulties at the Longcare residential home in Slough were beaten, verbally abused, drugged, indecently assaulted and raped. The actions resulted in an independent government inqury. Interviewing staff John Pring, describes an atmosphere of threats where staff were encouraged to spy on one another with inexperienced being hired and experienced healthcare workers leaving the organization.

The Winterbourne View hospital abuse case took place at a hospital for the treatment of individuals with learning difficulties and involved the physical abuse following a BBC documentary in 2011. Staff abused patients physically and psychologically and there were several instances of serious physical assault. The case resulted in the hospital being closed and 11 of the staff being prosecuted.

In 2019 an BBC documentary revealed abuse at Whorlton Hall, a treatment unit for those with learning disabilities or autism. Patients were threatened taunted, threatened, provoked, restrained on the floor for long periods of time. Staff implemented arbitrary punishment like removing patients belongings and staff routinely used sexually explicit language and gesture.

See also

References

Further reading
Nonfiction Books
 Bostwick, JS. The Patient Abuse and Neglect of Our Vulnerable Adults: America's Shame (2008)
 Caron, NK. Impact of effectiveness in implementation of the patient abuse reporting law on the reporting of "physical abuse, mistreatment, neglect" in residential health care facilities (1981)
  Close BA, Greenberg MS, Morgenstern BR Nursing Home Patient Abuse – Realities and Remedies (1981)
 Costa, MD Gynocide: Hysterectomy, Capitalist Patriarchy, and the Medical Abuse of Women (2007)
 Mackay, T. Without Due Care – An Australian Hospital Tragedy (2010)
 Shannon, JM. Patient abuse law: the reality (1983)
 Sundram CJ Patient abuse and mistreatment in psychiatric centers: a policy for reporting apparent crimes to and response by law enforcement agencies (1985)
 Thomas, G. Journey into madness:the true story of secret CIA mind control and medical abuse (1989)

Academic articles
 Armstrong B A Question of Abuse: Where Staff and Patient Rights Collide – Hosp Community Psychiatry 1979 May;30(5):348-51.
 Burkin K, Kleiner BH (1998) "Protecting the whistleblower: preventing retaliation following a report of patient abuse in health-care institutions", Health Manpower Management, Vol.24 Issue 3 Pages 119–124
 Gutheil TG Patient Abuse – Hosp Community Psychiatry 35:832, August 1984
 Isaacman SH Patient Abuse in Rural Midwestern Pregnant Women? – Archives of Family Medicine, 1993;2(4):351.
 LaRocco SA Patient Abuse Should Be Your Concern – Journal of Nursing Administration April 1985 – Volume 15 Issue 4 Pages 27–31
 LaRocco SA A case of patient abuse – American Journal of Nursing: November 1985 – Volume 85 Issue 11 Pages 1233–1236
 Santistevan A, Deiker T Asking the Patient About Abuse and Neglect-Five-Point Plan, Las Vegas (NM) Medical Center 1988
 Sundram CJ Obstacles to Reducing Patient Abuse in Public Institutions Hosp Community Psychiatry 35:238–243, March 1984

Fiction
 Abagnalo, George. Boy on a Pony (Moreland Press, 2001) (exploring privileged sexual abuse of patients within the healthcare system).

External links
 Patients First
 California Patient Abuse and Neglect Reporting Requirements Summary
 Doctors and Sexual Abuse – investigation by The Atlanta Journal-Constitution

Abuse
Health care quality
Patient safety
Nursing ethics
Institutional abuse
Patient
Social problems in medicine